José Manuel Ribeiro da Silva (16 February 1935 – 9 April 1958) was a Portuguese racing cyclist. He rode in the 1957 Tour de France. He also won the Volta a Portugal in 1955 and 1957.

Major results
1954
 2nd Road race, National Road Championships
 5th Overall Vuelta a Pontevedra
1955
 1st  Overall Volta a Portugal
1st Stages 1a, 1b & 12b
1956
 2nd Overall Volta a Portugal
1st Stage 8
1957
 1st  Overall Volta a Portugal
1st Stages 4 & 9
 1st 
 4th Overall Vuelta a España

References

External links
 

1935 births
1958 deaths
Portuguese male cyclists
People from Paredes, Portugal
Volta a Portugal winners
Sportspeople from Porto District